The Catholic Rent was a subscription that was to be paid monthly to the Catholic Association in Ireland. It amounted to one penny each month.  This was a tactic that was used by Daniel O'Connell from February 1824 to raise money for his campaign to gain Catholic Emancipation i.e., the right for Catholics to sit in Parliament.

References

History of Catholicism in Ireland